Tom O'Neill-Thorne (born 8 April 1997) is a 3.0 point wheelchair basketball player from Australia. He was part of the Rollers team that won the 2014 Incheon World Wheelchair Basketball Championship. He was a member of the  Rollers team that competed at 2020 Summer Paralympics, his second Games.

Biography 
Tom O'Neill-Thorne was born on 8 April 1997, with arthrogryposis multiplex, a congenital condition, which he describes succinctly as: "my legs didn’t grow properly". By the time he was two years old, he required a wheelchair, but watching the 2000 Summer Olympic Games in Sydney on television, he decided that he wanted to become an athlete.

Basketball 
O'Neill-Thorne took up wheelchair basketball when he was nine, when a local competition was established. He became a member of the Queensland Junior team, then the development squad at the Australian Institute of Sport, and, in 2012, at age 14, of the Queensland Spinning Bullets in the National Wheelchair Basketball League, where he was coached by Tom Kyle. As a 16 year old, in 2013, he averaged 17.1 points per game (eight in the league), 6.5 rebounds and 5 assists per game (sixth in the league).

That year O'Neill-Thorne was selected for his first international tournament, with the U23 team (the Spinners) in Dubai, where the team won gold. In 2013, he was part of the Spinners team at the IWBF U23 World Wheelchair Basketball Championship in Adana, Turkey, where they won bronze. Later that year he made his debut with the  senior national team (the Rollers) at the 2013  Asia-Oceania Zone Championships in Bangkok, and the following year was part of the Rollers team that won gold at the 2014 Incheon World Wheelchair Basketball Championship. He was the youngest ever Roller to play in a World Championship.

By 2016, O'Neill-Thorne was averaging 25.86 points per game with the Spinning Bullets. In June 2016, he toured Great Britain for the 2016 Continental Clash against Canada, Great Britain, Japan, the Netherlands and the United States. The Rollers were defeated by the United States, and won silver. In July, he was selected for the 2016 Summer Paralympics in Rio de Janeiro. He was one of five Rollers selected for their first Paralympics  where they finished sixth.

In 2018, he was a member of the Rollers that won the bronze medal at 2018 Wheelchair Basketball World Championship in Hamburg, Germany where he averaged 14.5 points, four rebounds and three assists per game.

At the 2020 Tokyo Paralympics, the Rollers finished fifth with a win–loss record of 4–4.  

O'Neill-Thorne was awarded the Northern Territory Government Sportsperson of the Year at the 2017 Northern Territory Sports Awards.

References

External links

Basketball Australia Profile

1997 births
Living people
Paralympic wheelchair basketball players of Australia
Wheelchair basketball players at the 2016 Summer Paralympics
Wheelchair basketball players at the 2020 Summer Paralympics
Point guards